Naif Abdulraheem Al-Hadhrami (born 18 July 2001) is a Qatari professional footballer who plays as a midfielder for Qatari club Al-Rayyan SC and the Qatar national football team.

References

External links

Qatari footballers
2001 births
Living people
Al-Rayyan SC players
Qatar Stars League players
Place of birth missing (living people)
2022 FIFA World Cup players
Qatari people of Yemeni descent